The grey-chinned sunbird (Anthreptes tephrolaemus) is a species of bird in the family Nectariniidae.
It is found in West Africa, namely Nigeria to Uganda, Kenya, Tanzania, Angola and Bioko. The yellow-chinned sunbird (Anthreptes rectirostris), was formerly grouped with this species.

References

grey-chinned sunbird
Birds of the Gulf of Guinea
grey-chinned sunbird
Birds of West Africa
Taxa named by Sir William Jardine